Slaughter Beach, Dog is a rock band from Philadelphia, Pennsylvania formed by Jake Ewald in 2014. Initially starting as one of Ewald's solo projects away from Modern Baseball, the group was realized after an indefinite hiatus of Modern Baseball was announced. The line-up originally featured vocalist and guitarist Jake Ewald, bassist Ian Farmer (also from Modern Baseball), guitarist Nick Harris (departed in 2020) from All Dogs, and former Superheaven drummer Zack Robbins.

Background 
The group had its beginnings as a solo project by Modern Baseball co-frontman Jake Ewald after encountering writer's block. Ewald released the project's debut EP Dawg in 2014, under the new moniker. He was soon signed with Lame-O Records, the label responsible for managing Modern Baseball. Under his new label, Ewald introduced his self-produced debut LP, Welcome, with generally positive reviews.

Following the announcement of Modern Baseball's hiatus in 2017, Ewald released EP Motorcycle.jpg in collaboration with former bandmate Ian Farmer in July. Ewald's second LP, Birdie, saw the project lineup expand with the addition of Farmer, Harris, and Robbins. With the project's newfound members, Slaughter Beach, Dog released Safe And Also No Fear in August of the following year, with a nationwide tour.

On December 24, 2020 the band's fourth studio album At The Moonbase was released. The album was written and recorded in solitude by Ewald due to the COVID-19 pandemic. 

The name is derived from a town in Delaware called Slaughter Beach. Ewald expressed a desire to name the band Slaughter Beach, having come across the location travelling between his house in Philadelphia and his parents house in Delaware. However, after discovering the name was already in use by another band in Europe, Ewald simply added a comma and the word "Dog".

Discography 
Studio albums

 Welcome (2016)
 Birdie (2017)
 Safe and Also No Fear (2019)
 At the Moonbase (2020)

EPs

 Dawg (2014)
 Motorcycle.jpg (2017)

Singles

 Monsters (2016)
 Building the Ark (2017)
 Acolyte (2017)
 Fish Fry (2017)
 Gold and Green (2017)
 Heart Attack / One Down / Good Ones (2019) 
 Fair Shot (2020)
 Just Like Me (2022)

Live Albums

 Slaughter Beach, Dog on Audiotree Live (2017)
 Live At The Cabin (2022)

Members
Current members

 Jake Ewald - vocals, guitar, keyboards, harmonica (2014–present)
 Ian Farmer - bass, keyboards, backing vocals (2016–present), guitar (2015–2016)
 Adam Meisterhans - guitar (2022–present)
 Zack Robbins - drums, percussion, backing vocals, synth (2017–present)
 Logan Roth - keys, synth, percussion (2022–present)

Past members

 Patrick "Dos" Ware - drums (2015-2017)
 Nick Harris - guitar, keyboards, backing vocals (2016–2020)
 Charlotte Anne Dole - drums (2022)

References 

American folk rock groups
Musical groups from Philadelphia
Musical groups established in 2014
2014 establishments in Pennsylvania
Lame-O Records artists